The 1940 Gonzaga Bulldogs football team was an American football team that represented Gonzaga University during the 1940 college football season. In their second year under head coach Puggy Hunton, the Bulldogs compiled a 5–4–1 record and outscored their opponents by a total of 133 to 79.

Senior halfback Tony Canadeo was the star of Gonzaga's 1940 team. He later played 11 seasons for the Green Bay Packers and was inducted in 1974 into the Pro Football Hall of Fame.

Schedule

References

Gonzaga
Gonzaga Bulldogs football seasons
Gonzaga Bulldogs football